Richard E. King is Professor of Buddhist and Asian Studies at the University of Kent, where he specialises in South Asian traditions and critical theory and Religious Studies.

Biography
King obtained his first degree in Philosophy and Theology at Hull University, before completing his PhD in Religious Studies at Lancaster University in 1993. He was appointed Lecturer in Religious Studies at the University of Stirling in 1990, where he was subsequently appointed as Reader. In 2000 he moved to Derby University as Professor and Chair of the Religious Studies department. From 2005 to 2010, he moved to the USA to serve as Professor of Religious Studies at Vanderbilt University; from there he joined the Department of Theology and Religious Studies at the University of Glasgow in 2010. In December 2012, he was appointed Professor of Buddhist and Asian Studies in the University of Kent. He has served as Visiting Professor and guest lecturer at Liverpool Hope and Cambridge University. He contributed to the Guggenheim Museum's exhibition "The Third Mind" as a member of the advisory committee, and has been invited to offer  public lectures by universities throughout Europe and the USA. He has served as co-chair for the Cultural History for the Study of Religion group for the American Academy of Religion.

Works 
 Early Advaita Vedānta and Buddhism: the Mahāyāna context of the Gauḍapādīya-kārikā. Series: SUNY Series in Religious Studies. (State University of New York Press, 1995). 
 Orientalism and Religion : Postcolonial Theory, India and 'the Mystic East' . (Routledge, 1999). 
 Indian Philosophy : an Introduction to Hindu and Buddhist Thought. (Edinburgh University Press, 1999). 
 with Carrette, Jeremy. Selling Spirituality: the Silent Takeover of Religion. (Routledge, 2005). 
 with Hinnells, John R. (Eds.) Religion and Violence in South Asia: Theory and Practice. (Routledge, 2007).

References

External links 
 University of Kent staff page for Richard King

Year of birth missing (living people)
Living people
Religious studies scholars
Hindu studies scholars
Academics of the University of Kent
Academics of the University of Stirling
Vanderbilt University faculty